Steven John Miles (born 15 November 1977) is an Australian politician. He has been the Deputy Premier of Queensland since May 2020, and been the Labor member for Murrumba in the Queensland Legislative Assembly since 2017, and previously represented Mount Coot-tha from 2015 to 2017.

Personal life
Miles has a Bachelor of Arts (BA) and Doctor of Philosophy (PhD) from the University of Queensland. Miles' PhD thesis was on Union Renewal. Prior to his election, Miles ran a local small business and has three young children. Miles also worked for the prominent Public Sector Union Together in Queensland, formally known as the QPSU, as an Industrial Relations Director and lead Organiser for several years.

Political career
Miles was the unsuccessful Labor candidate for Ryan at the 2010 Australian federal election.

In 2014, Miles defeated Fiona McNamara for preselection in the state seat of Mount Coot-tha, and was elected in the 2015 state election. He was sworn in as Minister for Environment and Heritage Protection and Minister for National Parks and the Great Barrier Reef in the First Palaszczuk Ministry on 16 February 2015.

Following the 2017 Queensland Electoral Redistribution, Miles stood for the North Brisbane electorate of Murrumba and was elected in the 2017 state election. He was appointed and sworn in as the Minister for Health and Ambulance Services in the Second Palaszczuk Ministry after the election.

On 10 May 2020, Miles was announced as the new Deputy Premier of Queensland and was sworn in the following day, following the resignation of the previous Deputy Premier Jackie Trad. He continued to be Minister for Health and Ambulance Services until the state election in October 2020, after which he was appointed as the Minister for State Development, Infrastructure, Local Government and Planning in the Third Palaszczuk Ministry.

References

1977 births
Living people
Members of the Queensland Legislative Assembly
Australian Labor Party members of the Parliament of Queensland
Labor Left politicians
Deputy Premiers of Queensland
21st-century Australian politicians